Puget Sound Coast Artillery Museum is a military museum located at Fort Worden State Park on Puget Sound, in the State of Washington.
The museum occupies part of Building 201, a former barracks at Fort Worden.

References

External links

Military and war museums in Washington (state)
Port Townsend, Washington